This is a list of natural disasters in the British Isles.

See also
List of disasters in Great Britain and Ireland by death toll
Climate of the United Kingdom
Geology of Great Britain
Geology of Ireland
Tsunamis affecting the British Isles
Drought in the United Kingdom
Floods in the United Kingdom

References

 List
Natural disasters
Natural disasters
Natural
Disasters
Nat